Myrichthys xysturus is an eel in the family Ophichthidae (worm/snake eels). It was described by David Starr Jordan and Charles Henry Gilbert in 1882, originally under the genus Ophichthys. It is a marine, tropical eel which is known from the eastern central Pacific Ocean, including the Gulf of California; Baja California Sur, Mexico; and the Galapagos Islands.

References

Myrichthys
Western Central American coastal fauna
Fish described in 1882
Taxa named by David Starr Jordan